The Textilease/Medique 300 was a NASCAR Busch Series stock car race held at South Boston Speedway, in South Boston, Virginia. The race distance was 200 laps in 1982 and from 1985 to 1990, 300 laps from 1983 to 1984 and in 1991, and 300 laps from 1994 to 2000.

Tommy Houston won the race three times, the most of any driver; Dennis Setzer scored his first career Busch Series victory in the 1994 event.

Past winners

References

External links
 

Former NASCAR races
NASCAR Xfinity Series races
NASCAR races at South Boston Speedway
1982 establishments in Virginia
2000 disestablishments in Virginia